Fairmile Marine was a British boat building company founded in 1939 by the car manufacturer Noel Macklin.

Macklin used the garage at his home at Cobham Fairmile in Surrey for manufacturing assembly which is why the boats he designed came to be called Fairmiles.

As a former Royal Horse Artillery and Royal Navy Volunteer Reserve officer, he was inspired to turn his talents and his technical staff to producing boats after reading an article by Vice-Admiral Cecil Vivian Usborne.

After his first designs were accepted and ordered by the Admiralty, Macklin found he had insufficient capital. To solve the problem the Fairmile company became an agency of the Admiralty with Usborne as one of the directors. As a result, the company carried out business without turning a profit, the staff being in effect part of the civil service.

Many Fairmile Bs were built in Commonwealth countries: 80 in Canada, 12 in New Zealand, and six in South Africa.

Boats designed

References
  Lambert, John and Ross, Al . Allied Coastal Forces of World War Two, Volume I : Fairmile designs and US Submarine Chasers. 1990. .

See also
 Vospers
 British Power Boat Company
 British Coastal Forces of World War II

Notes

External links

 The Fairmile Company
The Fairmile Bs of the Royal Canadian Navy

Borough of Elmbridge
Companies based in Surrey
Defunct shipbuilding companies of the United Kingdom
1939 establishments in England